Sandor Preisinger (born 11 December 1973) is a Hungarian football coach and a former player. He is an assistant coach with Fehérvár.

Sandor was a member of the Hungary squad that reached the 1996 Summer Olympics finals in Atlanta, USA.

He played 186 matches in the Hungarian First Division and scored a total of 64 goals. In the season 1994/95, Sandor Preisinger was the top scorer of the Hungarian league with 21 goals while playing for Zalaegerszegi TE.

He started his international career with Hungary on 5 June 1999 against Romania in a EURO 2000 qualifier match.

Honours
 Hungarian League:  
Winner: 1997, 1999 
Runner-Up: 2000

 Hungarian Cup:  
Winner: 1997, 1998, 2000 
Runner-up: 2002

References

Footmercato
FIFA
Sport Reference

1973 births
Living people
Hungarian footballers
Hungary international footballers
Hungary under-21 international footballers
Olympic footballers of Hungary
Hungarian expatriate footballers
Nemzeti Bajnokság I players
Zalaegerszegi TE players
MTK Budapest FC players
FC Sopron players
Szombathelyi Haladás footballers
Győri ETO FC players
Nyíregyháza Spartacus FC players
Expatriate footballers in Belgium
Zalaegerszegi TE managers
Association football forwards
Hungarian football managers
Footballers at the 1996 Summer Olympics
Békéscsaba 1912 Előre managers
People from Zalaegerszeg
Sportspeople from Zala County